Hiram Lloyd (July 23, 1863 – September 10, 1942) was an American builder and politician. He served as lieutenant governor of Missouri from 1921 to 1925.

Early life
Lloyd's English parents, Thomas and Hannah (Pepper) Lloyd, came to the United States in 1860 and settled in St. Clair County, Illinois, where Thomas became the county inspector of mines. Hiram Lloyd was born on the family farm there in 1863, one of eleven children. His brother Henry Lloyd became a doctor and was at one time chief coroner of St. Louis.

Lloyd moved to St. Louis in 1879 to be a carpenter's apprentice. He worked as a carpenter until 1890, when he began working as an independent contractor. In 1903 he incorporated the Hiram Lloyd Building & Construction Company, which became a prominent contractor constructing private and public buildings in the Midwest, including several high schools in St. Louis, the East St. Louis custom house and post office, and many other public buildings. A newspaper article in 1924 claimed the company had constructed more than ten million dollars worth of projects.

Political career
Lloyd served from 1885 to 1889 in the lower house of the St. Louis Municipal Assembly, serving as speaker for the last two years. He served in various Republican party posts, including being a state Republican committeeman from 1900 to 1904. He was a 1908 Republican National Convention delegate. Lloyd was elected to the state legislature in 1908 and 1910 and served as House minority leader. In 1912 he was the Republican candidate for lieutenant governor and lost to Democrat William Rock Painter. He was elected lieutenant governor of Missouri in 1920 on a Republican ticket with governor Arthur M. Hyde, serving from January 10, 1921 to January 12, 1925. Lloyd then ran for the Republican nomination for governor in 1924, but came in a distant second to Superintendent of Schools Sam Aaron Baker in a three-way race.

Family
Lloyd married English-born Jane Ann Maitland (1868 - 1919) on May 27, 1888. They had at least three sons, Thomas Henry (1889-1958), Hiram (died as an infant), and Weston Robert Lloyd.

Lloyd died of bronchial pneumonia and is buried in Green Mount Protestant Cemetery in Belleville, Illinois.

Partial list of Hiram Lloyd Building & Construction buildings
Notable buildings built, in part or in whole, by Hiram Lloyd Building & Construction include:
 McKinley High School (St. Louis, Missouri), 1904
 Greene County Courthouse, Springfield, Missouri, 1910 - 1912
 Strong Hall (Lawrence, Kansas), 1911
 Washington Irving High School, Clarksburg, West Virginia, 1914
 Miles City Main Post Office, Miles City, Montana, 1916
 Post Office Fredericktown, Missouri, 1936

References

1863 births
1942 deaths
American carpenters
American builders
Lieutenant Governors of Missouri
Politicians from St. Louis
People from St. Clair County, Illinois
20th-century American politicians
Missouri Republicans